Urddalsknuten or Urdalsknuten is a mountain that lies on the border of the municipalities of Sirdal and Valle in Agder county, Norway. The  mountain is located in the Setesdalsheiene mountain range. The lakes Botnsvatnet, Kolsvatnet, and Rosskreppfjorden surround the mountain to the northeast and south and the mountain Bergeheii lies directly to the north.

See also
List of mountains of Norway

References

Mountains of Agder
Valle, Norway
Sirdal